The 2010–11 Anaheim Ducks season was the 18th season of operation for the National Hockey League (NHL) franchise. After a disappointing previous season, the Ducks attempted to win the Stanley Cup for the second time in franchise history. They were ultimately defeated by the Nashville Predators in the first round of the playoffs.

Off-season
The Anaheim Ducks entered the off-season with much speculation regarding the possible retirement of two mainstays in Anaheim: Scott Niedermayer and Teemu Selanne. On Tuesday, June 22, 2010, captain Scott Niedermayer announced his retirement from professional hockey, while it was reported Selanne would stay so long as the Ducks did not go into a "rebuilding" season.

On July 1, the Ducks re-signed center Saku Koivu to a two-year contract and signed defenseman Toni Lydman to a three-year contract. The Ducks later signed Andy Sutton to a two-year contract, and on August 9, signed Teemu Selanne to a one-year contract to continue his playing career. During training camp, the Ducks signed defenseman Paul Mara to a one-year contract, and after a few games into the season, the Ducks signed another defenseman, veteran Andreas Lilja, to a one-year contract.

Forward Ryan Getzlaf was named team captain following Scott Niedermayer's retirement.

Regular season
See the game log below for detailed game-by-game regular season information.

The season for the Ducks began Friday, October 8 with a road game against Detroit.  Their first home game was Wednesday, October 13 against Vancouver.  Their longest homestand was from February 23 to March 9 (seven home games), and their longest road trip was December 15 to 28 (seven road games). Their final game of the regular season was on Saturday, April 9 against Los Angeles.

October
After much talk about having a good start, the Ducks had one of their worst starts in franchise history losing their first three games and going 4–7–1 in the month of October. Their first three games were on the road in Detroit, Nashville, and St. Louis, they were outscored 13–2 and were shut out by Detroit in the first game of the season. Returning home, the Ducks rebounded a little bit after the horrendous first three games by beating the eventual President's Trophy winner Vancouver Canucks 4–3. They proceeded to lose the next game in a shootout to the Minnesota Wild and beat division rival Phoenix to close out the three game home stand. The Ducks then went 1–1 in the first two games of a four-game road trip and were able to seize a playoff spot despite the 0–3 start to the season. However, they lost the next game to Detroit 5–4 to knock them out of the top eight and even though they won the final game of the road trip, they didn't return to the top eight until November 9. On the road trip, the Ducks went 2–2. When the Ducks returned to Honda Center on the 29th, they faced the team that beat them in the Stanley Cup Final in 2003: the New Jersey Devils. The Devils edged the Ducks 2–1 and to round out what was a disappointing month, Anaheim lost to arch-rival San Jose on the 30th.

November
The beginning of the month of November couldn't have been any more different from the beginning of the month of October for the Ducks. They went 6–0 in their first 6 games with five of those six games being played in Anaheim at Honda Center. Five of those six games were one goal games with two going to overtime. On November 9, the Ducks took hold of a playoff berth with an overtime win over arch-rival San Jose at HP Pavilion and rounded out the six-game winning streak with a 4–2 victory over division rival Dallas at Honda Center. While the month started out very well for Anaheim, inconsistency struck the Ducks and they lost six games in a row, only collecting two points from November 14 through November 26 thanks to two overtime losses at Chicago and at Minnesota. This slide cost the Ducks a playoff spot for the time being. Anaheim finished off the month with a win over Phoenix at Jobing.com Arena and a win over cross-town rival Los Angeles in front of a sold-out crowd at Honda Center. While the Ducks' 8–4–2 record was markedly better than their record in the month of October, inconsistency still plagued the team.

December
December proved to be an incredibly challenging month for Anaheim thanks to the longest road trip of the season (7 games). They started out by beating the Florida Panthers, but promptly losing the next two games to Detroit and Phoenix on December 3 and December 5 respectively. After those three games, the Ducks only had two games at Honda Center from December 7 through December 28 and they started this stretch of time well by beating the Edmonton Oilers in a shootout at Rexall Place and taking a point from the Vancouver Canucks by virtue of a shootout loss at Rogers Arena. With the victory over the Oilers, the Ducks moved above the .500 mark and did not fall below that mark for the rest of the 2010–11 season. The Ducks returned home to beat the Calgary Flames 3–2 in a shootout and after three straight games being decided in the shootout, the Ducks beat the Minnesota Wild decisively 6–2. After the game against the Wild on the 12th, the Anaheim Ducks did not return to the friendly confines of Honda Center until December 31. Anaheim started out the road trip well by beating the reeling Washington Capitals (the Washington loss marked their seventh in a row of an eventual eight game skid), however, in front of the smallest crowd of the season (7,659) the Ducks fell to the lowly New York Islanders at the Nassau Coliseum. The Ducks then lost two of the next three games, beating only the Boston Bruins before heading into the short Christmas break. Back home in Southern California, the Ducks dropped the first game after Christmas to cross-town rival Los Angeles at Staples Center, but they did win the final two games of the month at Phoenix and finally back home at Honda Center over the Philadelphia Flyers. The game on December 31 against the Flyers, was originally intended to be Chris Pronger's first game at Honda Center since his trade, however, due to injuries, he was unable to play. Despite an 8–6–1 record, the Ducks were in a playoff position for most of the month of December partially thanks to the fact that they had played more games than any other Western Conference team. They were also the first in the Western Conference to reach the 41 game mark (halfway point in the season) and they got there with 44 points. This marked the team's third best first half since the lockout only behind their 62-point showing in 2006–07 and their 47 points in 2008–09.

January
The Ducks went on a roll in the month of January winning 8 of 11 games. Throughout the month, however, all of Anaheim's wins were very close games with the Ducks winning by only one goal with the exception of the 6–0 victory over Columbus on January 7. Anaheim was on a long homestand during the first half of the month and started with a 1–1 record in the new year by defeating the defending champion Blackhawks and falling to the Nashville Predators in front of the smallest home crowd of the season (a mere 12,216). After that loss, they took advantage of home ice by taking down the Blue Jackets, rival Sharks, and Blues. Anaheim then fell to the Phoenix Coyotes in a short one game road trip to the desert but then came home to defeat the Edmonton Oilers on January 16 in their final home game until after the All-Star Game. Heading out on the road, the Ducks were to face the Ottawa Senators, Toronto Maple Leafs, Montreal Canadiens, and Columbus Blue Jackets. Overall, Anaheim had a very good road trip only falling to Toronto. The game against the Leafs was significant because it was the first time former Ducks netminder (and Ducks starter in the 2003 and 2007 finals) J.S. Giguere faced his old team. Giguere got the best of Anaheim by posting a 5–2 victory. The game at Montreal was also significant because it was Ducks centerman Saku Koivu's first time playing at the Bell Centre since he signed with Anaheim prior to the 2009–10 season. The Canadien faithful gave Koivu an incredibly warm welcome, but in the end, the patrons at the Bell Centre were not pleased with the final result as Anaheim skated away with a 4–3 shootout victory. Going into the All-Star Game, the Ducks had 60 points, enough to be in the top 8 and were honored to send 3 players to the festivities in Raleigh, North Carolina. Ducks winger Corey Perry was selected alongside goaltender Jonas Hiller (the only goaltender from the Western Conference) to participate in the game. Rookie defenseman Cam Fowler also attended, but he (along with many other rookies) were only there to compete in the skills tournament.

Playoffs
The Ducks clinched a playoff spot on Friday, April 8 after a 2–1 defeat of the Los Angeles Kings in a Freeway Face-Off matchup. 2011 marked the first year the Kings and Ducks have been in the playoffs simultaneously.

The Ducks were eliminated in the first round of the playoffs by fifth-seeded Nashville, losing the series four games to two.

Schedule and results

Preseason 

|- align="center" bgcolor="#ffbbbb"
| 1 || September 12 || Sharks || 4–1 ||  || Anderson (1–0–0) || Pielmeier (0–1–0) || 3,500 || 0–1–0 || South Okanagan Events Centre || L1 
|- align="center" bgcolor="#ffbbbb"
| 2 || September 13 || Flames || 8–4 ||  || Keetley (1–0–0) || Cousineau (0–1–0) || 2,500 || 0–2–0 || South Okanagan Events Centre || L2 
|- align="center" bgcolor="#bbffbb"
| 3 || September 15 || @ Canucks || 4–2 ||  || Pielmeier (1–1–0) || Houser (0–2–0) || 3,000 || 1–2–0 || South Okanagan Events Centre || W1 
|-

|- align="center" bgcolor="#ffbbbb"
| 1 || September 21 || Coyotes || 4–1 ||  || LaBarbera (1–0–0) || McElhinney (0–1–0) || 12,382 || 0–1–0 || Honda Center || L1
|- align="center" bgcolor="#bbffbb"
| 2 || September 22 || Sharks ||| 5–2 ||  || Hiller (1–0–0) || Niittymaki (0–1–0) || 12,633 || 1–1–0 || Honda Center || W1
|- align="center" bgcolor="#bbffbb"
| 3 || September 24 || @ Sharks || 5–4 ||  || Pielmeier (1–0–0) || Sateri (0–1–0) || 15,872 || 2–1–0 || HP Pavilion at San Jose || W2
|- align="center" bgcolor="#ffbbbb"
| 4 || September 25 || @ Canucks || 4–1 ||  || Luongo (1–0–0) || Hiller (1–1–0) || 18,860 || 2–2–0 || Rogers Arena || L1
|- align="center" bgcolor="#ffbbbb"
| 5 || September 28 || @ Kings || 8–3 ||  || Quick (1–1–0) || McElhinney (0–2–0) || 12,520 || 2–3–0 || Staples Center || L2
|-

|- align="center" bgcolor="#ffbbbb"
| 6 || October 1 || Canucks || 4–2 ||  || Schneider (2–3–0) || Hiller (1–2–0) || 14,235 || 2–4–0 || Honda Center || L3
|- align="center" bgcolor="#bbffbb"
| 7 || October 3 || Kings || 3–2 || OT || Hiller (1–2–1) || Bernier (1–0–1) || 16,329 || 3–4–0 || Honda Center || W1
|-

Regular season 

|- align="center" bgcolor="bbffbb"
|- align="center" bgcolor="#ffdddd"
|- align="center" bgcolor="#ffbbbb"
| 1 || October 8 || @ Red Wings || 4–0 ||  || Howard (1–0–0) || Hiller (0–1–0) || 20,066 || 0–1–0 || Joe Louis Arena || L1 || bgcolor="ffbbbb" | 0
|- align="center" bgcolor="#ffbbbb"
| 2 || October 9 || @ Predators || 4–1 ||  || Rinne (1–0–0) || Hiller (0–2–0) || 17,113 || 0–2–0 || Bridgestone Arena || L1 || bgcolor="ffbbbb" | 0
|- align="center" bgcolor="#ffbbbb"
| 3 || October 11 || @ Blues || 5–1 ||  || Halak (2–0–0) || Hiller (0–3–0) || 19,150 || 0–3–0 || Scottrade Center || L3 || bgcolor="ffbbbb" | 0
|- align="center" bgcolor="bbffbb"
| 4 || October 13 || Canucks || 4–3 ||  || Hiller (1–3–0) || Luongo (1–1–1) || 17,174 || 1–3–0 || Honda Center || W1 || bgcolor="ffbbbb" | 2
|- align="center" bgcolor="#ffdddd"
| 5 || October 15 || Thrashers || 5–4 || SO || Mason (2–2–0) || Hiller (1–3–1) || 13,123 || 1–3–1 || Honda Center || O1 || bgcolor="ffbbbb" | 3
|- align="center" bgcolor="bbffbb"
| 6 || October 17 || Coyotes || 3–2 ||  || Hiller (2–3–1) || LaBarbera (0–1–0) || 13,574 || 2–3–1 || Honda Center || W1 || bgcolor="ffbbbb" | 5
|- align="center" bgcolor="#ffbbbb"
| 7 || October 20 || @ Blue Jackets || 3–1 ||  || Mason (2–2–0) || Hiller (2–4–1) || 9,802 || 2–4–1 || Nationwide Arena || L1 || bgcolor="ffbbbb" | 5
|- align="center" bgcolor="bbffbb"
| 8 || October 21 || @ Flyers || 3–2 ||  || McElhinney (1–0–0) || Bobrovsky (2–2–0) || 19,012 || 3–4–1 || Wells Fargo Center || W1 || bgcolor="bbcaff" | 7
|- align="center" bgcolor="#ffbbbb"
| 9 || October 23 || @ Red Wings || 5–4 ||  || Howard (4–0–1) || McElhinney (1–1–0) || 19,401 || 3–5–1 || Joe Louis Arena || L1 || bgcolor="ffbbbb" | 7
|- align="center" bgcolor="bbffbb" 
| 10 || October 26 || @ Stars || 5–2 ||  || Hiller (3–4–1) || Lehtonen (5–3–0) || 12,378 || 4–5–1 || American Airlines Center || W1 || bgcolor="ffbbbb" | 9
|- align="center" bgcolor="#ffbbbb"
| 11 || October 29 || Devils || 2–1 ||  || Brodeur (3–6–1) || Hiller (3–5–1) || 14,724 || 4–6–1 || Honda Center || L1 || bgcolor="ffbbbb" | 9
|- align="center" bgcolor="#ffbbbb"
| 12 || October 30 || @ Sharks || 5–2 ||  || Niittymaki (4–0–1) || McElhinney (1–2–0) || 17,562 || 4–7–1 || HP Pavilion at San Jose || L2 || bgcolor="ffbbbb" | 9
|-

|- align="center" bgcolor="bbffbb" 
| 13 || November 3 || Lightning || 3–2 || OT || Hiller (4–5–1) || Ellis (3–2–2) || 13,034 || 5–7–1 || Honda Center || W1 || bgcolor="ffbbbb" | 11
|- align="center" bgcolor="bbffbb" 
| 14 || November 5 || Penguins || 3–2 ||  || Hiller (5–5–1) || Fleury (1–6–0) || 17,174 || 6–7–1 || Honda Center || W2 || bgcolor="ffbbbb" | 13
|- align="center" bgcolor="bbffbb" 
| 15 || November 7 || Predators || 5–4 ||  || Hiller (6–5–1) || Lindback (3–1–1) || 13,520 || 7–7–1 || Honda Center || W3 || bgcolor="ffbbbb" | 15
|- align="center" bgcolor="bbffbb"
| 16 || November 9 || @ Sharks || 3–2 || OT || Hiller (7–5–1) || Niittymaki (5–1–2) || 17,562 || 8–7–1 || HP Pavilion at San Jose || W4 || bgcolor="bbcaff" | 17
|- align="center" bgcolor="bbffbb"
| 17 || November 10 || Islanders || 1–0 ||  || McElhinney (2–2–0) || Roloson (2–6–0) || 14,393 || 9–7–1 || Honda Center || W5 || bgcolor="bbcaff" | 19
|- align="center" bgcolor="bbffbb"
| 18 || November 12 || Stars || 4–2 ||  || Hiller (8–5–1) || Lehtonen (7–6–0) || 13,831 || 10–7–1 || Honda Center || W6 || bgcolor="bbcaff" | 21
|- align="center" bgcolor="ffdddd"
| 19 || November 14 || @ Blackhawks || 3–2 || OT || Crawford (2–4–0) || Hiller (8–5–2) || 21,224 || 10–7–2 || United Center || O1 || bgcolor="bbcaff" | 22
|- align="center" bgcolor="#ffbbbb"
| 20 || November 16 || @ Stars || 2–1 ||  || Lehtonen (8–6–0) || Hiller (8–6–2) || 13,443 || 10–8–2 || American Airlines Center || L1 || bgcolor="bbcaff" | 22
|- align="center" bgcolor="ffdddd"
| 21 || November 17 || @ Wild || 2–1 || OT || Backstrom (8–4–2) || McElhinney (2–2–1) || 16,890 || 10–8–3 || Xcel Energy Center  || O1 || bgcolor="bbcaff" | 23
|- align="center"" bgcolor="#ffbbbb"
| 22 || November 19 || Blue Jackets || 4–3 ||  || Mason (6–6–0) || Hiller (8–7–2) || 13,667 || 10–9–3 || Honda Center || L1 || bgcolor="bbcaff" | 23
|- align="center"" bgcolor="#ffbbbb"
| 23 || November 21 || Oilers || 4–2 ||  || Dubnyk (1–0–3) || Hiller (8–8–2) || 14,267 || 10–10–3 || Honda Center || L2 || bgcolor="ffbbbb" | 23
|- align="center"" bgcolor="#ffbbbb"
| 24 || November 26 || Blackhawks || 4–1 ||  || Crawford (4–4–0) || Hiller (8–9–2) || 16,146 || 10–11–3 || Honda Center  || L3 || bgcolor="ffbbbb" | 23
|- align="center"  bgcolor="bbffbb"
| 25 || November 27 || @ Coyotes || 6–4 ||  || Hiller (9–9–2) || Bryzgalov (10–3–5) || 12,708 || 11–11–3 || Jobing.com Arena  || W1 || bgcolor="ffbbbb" | 25
|- align="center"  bgcolor="bbffbb"
| 26 || November 29 || Kings || 2–0 ||  || Hiller (10–9–2) || Quick (11–5–0) || 17,174 || 12–11–3 || Honda Center  || W2 || bgcolor="ffbbbb" | 27
|-

|- align="center" bgcolor="bbffbb"
| 27 || December 1 || Panthers || 5–3 ||  || Hiller (11–9–2) || Vokoun (9–9–0) || 12,504 || 13–11–3 || Honda Center || W3 || bgcolor="bbcaff" | 29
|- align="center" bgcolor="#ffbbbb"
| 28 || December 3 || Red Wings || 4–0 ||  || Howard (15–2–2) || Hiller (11–10–2) || 15,173 || 13–12–3 || Honda Center || L1 || bgcolor="bbcaff" | 29
|- align="center" bgcolor="#ffbbbb"
| 29 || December 5 || Coyotes || 3–0 || || Bryzgalov (11–4–6) || Hiller (11–11–2) || 14,062 || 13–13–3 || Honda Center || L2 || bgcolor="ffbbbb" | 29
|- align="center" bgcolor="bbffbb" 
| 30 || December 7 || @ Oilers || 3–2 || SO || Hiller (12–11–2) || Khabibulin (6–10–2) || 16,839 || 14–13–3 || Rexall Place || W1|| bgcolor="bbcaff" | 31
|- align="center" bgcolor="ffdddd" 
| 31 || December 8 || @ Canucks || 5–4 || SO || Luongo (12–8–2) || Hiller (12–11–3) || 18,860 || 14–13–4 || Rogers Arena || O1 || bgcolor="bbcaff" | 32
|- align="center" bgcolor="bbffbb" 
| 32 || December 10 || Flames || 3–2 || SO || Hiller (13–11–3) || Karlsson (2–1–2) || 13,775 || 15–13–4 || Honda Center || W1 || bgcolor="bbcaff" | 34
|- align="center" bgcolor="bbffbb" 
| 33 || December 12 || Wild || 6–2 ||  || Hiller (14–11–3) || Backstrom (9–8–3) || 14,338 || 16–13–4 || Honda Center || W2 || bgcolor="bbcaff" | 36
|- align="center" bgcolor="bbffbb" 
| 34 || December 15 || @ Capitals || 2–1 || OT || Hiller (15–11–3) || Varlamov (4–4–1) || 18,398 || 17–13–4 || Verizon Center || W3 || bgcolor="bbcaff" | 38
|- align="center" bgcolor="#ffbbbb"
| 35 || December 16 || @ Islanders || 3–2 ||  || DiPietro (4–6–4) || McElhinney (2–3–1) || 7,659 || 17–14–4 || Nassau Memorial Coliseum || L1 || bgcolor="bbcaff" | 38
|- align="center" bgcolor="#ffbbbb"
| 36 || December 18 || @ Hurricanes || 4–2 ||  || Ward (14–9–3) || Hiller (15–12–3) || 16,603 || 17–15–4 || RBC Center || L2 || bgcolor="bbcaff" | 38
|- align="center" bgcolor="bbffbb" 
| 37 || December 20 || @ Bruins || 3–0 ||  || Hiller (16–12–3) || Thomas (15–4–3) || 17,565 || 18–15–4 || TD Garden || W1 || bgcolor="bbcaff" | 40
|- align="center" bgcolor="#ffbbbb"
| 38 || December 21 || @ Sabres || 5–2 ||  || Miller (12–10–3) || McElhinney (2–4–1) || 18,690 || 18–16–4 || HSBC Arena || L1 || bgcolor="bbcaff" | 40
|- align="center" bgcolor="#ffbbbb"
| 39 || December 26 || @ Kings || 4–1 ||  || Bernier (4–5–0) || Hiller (16–13–3) || 18,313 || 18–17–4 || Staples Center || L2 || bgcolor="ffbbbb" | 40
|- align="center" bgcolor="bbffbb" 
| 40 || December 28 || @ Coyotes || 3–1 ||  || Hiller (17–13–3) || Bryzgalov (12–7–6) || 14,032 || 19–17–4 || Jobing.com Arena || W1 || bgcolor="ffbbbb" | 42
|- align="center" bgcolor="bbffbb" 
| 41 || December 31 || Flyers || 5–2 ||  || Hiller (18–13–3) || Bobrovsky (15–6–3) || 17,103 || 20–17–4 || Honda Center || W2 || bgcolor="bbcaff" | 44
|-

|- align="center" bgcolor="#bbffbb" 
| 42 || January 2 || Blackhawks || 2–1 ||  || Hiller (19–13–3) || Crawford (11–7–1) || 16,004 || 21–17–4 || Honda Center || W3 || bgcolor="bbcaff" | 46
|- align="center" bgcolor="#ffbbbb"
| 43 || January 5 || Predators || 4–1 ||  || Rinne (11–10–4) || Hiller (19–14–3) || 12,216 || 21–18–4 || Honda Center || L1 || bgcolor="bbcaff" | 46
|- align="center" bgcolor="#bbffbb" 
| 44 || January 7 || Blue Jackets || 6–0 ||  || Hiller (20–14–3) || Mason (12–11–1) || 12,815 || 22–18–4 || Honda Center || W1 || bgcolor="bbcaff" | 48
|- align="center" bgcolor="#bbffbb" 
| 45 || January 9 || Sharks || 1–0 ||  || Hiller (21–14–3) || Niemi (9–12–2) || 16,172 || 23–18–4 || Honda Center || W2 || bgcolor="bbcaff" | 50
|- align="center" bgcolor="#bbffbb" 
| 46 || January 12 || Blues || 7–4 ||  || Hiller (22–14–3) || Conklin (5–3–2) || 12,499 || 24–18–4 || Honda Center || W3 || bgcolor="bbcaff" | 52
|- align="center" bgcolor="#ffbbbb"
| 47 || January 15 || Coyotes || 6–2 ||  || Bryzgalov (17–8–6) || Hiller (22–15–3) || 10,951 || 24–19–4 || Jobing.com Arena || L1 || bgcolor="bbcaff" | 52
|- align="center" bgcolor="bbffbb"
| 48 || January 16 || Oilers || 3–2 || || McElhinney (3–4–1) || Khabibulin (8–19–2) || 15,764 || 25–19–4 || Honda Center || W1 || bgcolor="bbcaff" | 54
|- align="center" bgcolor="bbffbb"
| 49 || January 18 || @ Senators || 2–1 || SO || Hiller (23–15–3) || Elliott (12–16–6) || 19,515 || 26–19–4 || Scotiabank Place || W2 || bgcolor="bbcaff" | 56
|- align="center" bgcolor="ffbbbb"
| 50 || January 20 || @ Maple Leafs || 5–2 ||  || Giguere (9–7–3) || Hiller (23–16–3) || 19,399 || 26–20–4 || Air Canada Centre || L1 || bgcolor="bbcaff" | 56
|- align="center" bgcolor="bbffbb"
| 51 || January 22 || @ Canadiens || 4–3 || SO || Hiller (24–16–3) || Price (24–16–4) || 21,273 || 27–20–4 || Bell Centre || W1 || bgcolor="bbcaff" | 58
|- align="center" bgcolor="bbffbb"
| 52 || January 25 || @ Blue Jackets || 3–2 ||  || Hiller (25–16–3) || Mason (15–12–2) || 11,700 || 28–20–4 || Nationwide Arena || W2 || bgcolor="bbcaff" | 60
|- align="center" bgcolor="#bbcaff" 
| colspan="3" | Jan. 30: All-Star Game (Lidstrom wins—box) || 11–10 ||  || Thomas (BOS) || Lundqvist (NYR) || 18,680 ||  || RBC Center || colspan="2" | Raleigh, NC
|-

|- align="center" bgcolor="ffbbbb"
| 53 || February 2 || Sharks || 4–3 ||  || Niemi (14–13–3) || McElhinney (3–5–1) || 14,486 || 28–21–4 || Honda Center || L1 || bgcolor="bbcaff" | 60
|- align="center" bgcolor="bbffbb"
| 54 || February 5 || @ Avalanche || 3–0 ||  || McElhinney (4–5–1) || Budaj (12–8–3) || 16,785 || 29–21–4 || Pepsi Center || W1 || bgcolor="bbcaff" | 62
|- align="center" bgcolor="bbffbb"
| 55 || February 9 || @ Canucks || 4–3 ||  || McElhinney (5–5–1) || Schneider (9–3–2) || 18,860 || 30–21–4 || Rogers Arena || W2 || bgcolor="bbcaff" | 64
|- align="center" bgcolor="bbffbb"
| 56 || February 11 || @ Flames || 5–4 || OT || McElhinney (6–5–1) || Kiprusoff (24–18–4) || 19,289 || 31–21–4 || Scotiabank Saddledome || W3 || bgcolor="bbcaff" | 66
|- align="center" bgcolor="bbffbb"
| 57 || February 13 || @ Oilers || 4–0 ||  || Hiller (26–16–3) || Dubnyk (6–7–6) || 16,839 || 32–21–4 || Rexall Place || W4 || bgcolor="bbcaff" | 68
|- align="center" bgcolor="ffbbbb"
| 58 || February 16 || Capitals || 7–6 ||  || Neuvirth (17–8–4) || McElhinney (6–6–1) || 15,579 || 32–22–4 || Honda Center || L1 || bgcolor="bbcaff" | 68
|- align="center" bgcolor="ffbbbb"
| 59 || February 18 || @ Wild || 5–1 || || Backstrom (19–13–3) || McElhinney (6–7–1) || 18,967 || 32–23–4 || Xcel Energy Center || L2 || bgcolor="bbcaff" | 68
|- align="center" bgcolor="ffbbbb"
| 60 || February 19 || @ Blues || 9–3 || || Bishop (1–0–0) || McElhinney (6–8–1) || 19,150 || 32–24–4 || Scottrade Center || L3 || bgcolor="bbcaff" | 68 
|- align="center" bgcolor="#ffbbbb" 
| 61 || February 23 || Kings || 3–2 ||  || Quick (27–15–2) || McElhinney‡ (6–9–1) || 17,174 || 32–25–4 || Honda Center || L4 || bgcolor="ffbbbb" | 68 
|- align="center" bgcolor="#ffdddd"  
| 62 || February 25 || Wild || 3–2 || OT || Theodore (11–9–2) || Ellis† (0–0–1) || 13,617 || 32–25–5 || Honda Center || O1 || bgcolor="ffbbbb" | 69
|- align="center" bgcolor="#bbffbb" 
| 63 || February 27 || Avalanche || 3–2 ||  || Ellis (1–0–1) || Budaj (13–13–4) || 14,510 || 33–25–5 || Honda Center || W1 || bgcolor="ffbbbb" | 71
|-

|- align="center" bgcolor="#bbffbb" 
| 64 || March 2 || Red Wings || 2–1 || OT || Ellis (2–0–1) || Howard (31–12–4) || 15,098 || 34–25–5 || Honda Center || W2 || bgcolor="ffbbbb" | 73
|- align="center" bgcolor="#bbffbb"
| 65 || March 4 || Stars || 4–3 || OT || Ellis (3–0–1) || Lehtonen (26–18–7) || 12,883 || 35–25–5 || Honda Center || W3 || bgcolor="ffbbbb" | 75
|- align="center" bgcolor="ffbbbb"
| 66 || March 6 || Canucks || 3–0 ||  || Schneider (12–3–2) || Ellis (3–1–1) || 16,356 || 35–26–5 || Honda Center || L1 || bgcolor="ffbbbb" | 75
|- align="center" bgcolor="#bbffbb" 
| 67 || March 9 || Rangers || 5–2 ||  || Ellis (4–1–1) || Lundqvist (27–24–4) || 14,251 || 36–26–5 || Honda Center || W1 || bgcolor="ffbbbb" | 77
|- align="center" bgcolor="#bbffbb" 
| 68 || March 11 || @ Avalanche || 6–2 ||  || Ellis (5–1–1) || Elliott (13–23–9) || 16,244 || 37–26–5 || Pepsi Center || W2 || bgcolor="ffbbbb" | 79
|- align="center" bgcolor="#ffbbbb"
| 69 || March 13 || Coyotes || 5–2 || || Bryzgalov (30–17–8) || Ellis (5–2–1) || 14,326 || 37–27–5 || Honda Center || L1 || bgcolor="ffbbbb" | 79
|- align="center" bgcolor="#bbffbb" 
| 70 || March 16 || Blues || 2–1 ||  || Emery (1–0–0) || Halak (21–19–6) || 12,604 || 38–27–5 || Honda Center || W1 || bgcolor="bbcaff" | 81
|- align="center" bgcolor="#bbffbb" 
| 71 || March 19 || @ Kings || 2–1 || OT || Emery (2–0–0) || Quick (30–18–3) || 18,118 || 39–27–5 || Staples Center || W2 || bgcolor="ffbbbb" | 83
|- align="center" bgcolor="#bbffbb" 
| 72 || March 20 || Flames || 5–4 || OT || Ellis (6–2–1) || Karlsson (4–5–5) || 15,177 || 40–27–5 || Honda Center || W3 || bgcolor="bbcaff" | 85
|- align="center" bgcolor="#bbffbb" 
| 73 || March 23 || @ Stars || 4–3 || OT || Emery (3–0–0) || Lehtonen (30–20–10) || 16,021 || 41–27–5 || American Airlines Center || W4 || bgcolor="bbcaff" | 87
|- align="center" bgcolor="#ffbbbb"
| 74 || March 24 || @ Predators || 5–4 || || Rinne (29–20–8) || Ellis (6–3–1) || 17,113 || 41–28–5 || Bridgestone Arena || L1 || bgcolor="bbcaff" | 87
|- align="center" bgcolor="#bbffbb" 
| 75 || March 26 || @ Blackhawks || 2–1 ||  || Emery (4–0–0) || Crawford (29–15–5) || 22,115 || 42–28–5 || United Center || W1 || bgcolor="bbcaff" | 89
|- align="center" bgcolor="#bbffbb" 
| 76 || March 28 || Avalanche || 5–4 ||  || Emery (5–0–0) || Elliott (15–25–9) || 14,336 || 43–28–5 || Honda Center || W2 || bgcolor="bbcaff" | 91
|- align="center" bgcolor="#bbffbb" 
| 77 || March 30 || @ Flames || 4–2 ||  || Emery (6–0–0) || Kiprusoff (34–24–6) || 19,289 || 44–28–5 || Scotiabank Saddledome || W3 || bgcolor="bbcaff" | 93
|- align="center" 

|- align="center" bgcolor="#ffbbbb"
| 78 || April 2 || @ Sharks || 4–2 ||  || Niemi (33–17–6) || Emery (6–1–0) || 17,562 || 44–29–5 || HP Pavilion at San Jose || L1 || bgcolor="bbcaff" | 93
|- align="center" bgcolor="#ffbbbb" 
| 79 || April 3 || Stars || 4–3 ||  || Lehtonen (31–23–11) || Emery (6–2–0) || 16,424 || 44–30–5 || Honda Center || L2 || bgcolor="bbcaff" | 93
|- align="center" bgcolor="#bbffbb"
| 80 || April 6 || Sharks || 6–2 ||  || Emery (7–2–0) || Niittymaki (12–7–3) || 15,649 || 45–30–5 || Honda Center || W1 || bgcolor="bbcaff" | 95
|- align="center"  style="background: #000078; color: white"
| 81 || April 8 || Kings || 2–1 || || Ellis (7–3–1) || Quick (35–21–3) || 17,587 || 46–30–5 || Honda Center || W2 || 97
|- align="center" bgcolor="#bbffbb"
| 82 || April 9 || @ Kings || 3–1 ||  || Ellis (8–3–1) || Quick (35–22–3) || 18,203 || 47–30–5 || Staples Center || W3 || bgcolor="bbcaff" | 99
|-

Postseason

|- align="center" bgcolor="#ffbbbb"
| 1 || April 13 || Predators || 4–1 ||  || Rinne (1–0) || Ellis (0–1) || 17,174 || 0–1 || Honda Center || L1
|- align-"center" bgcolor="#bbffbb"
| 2 || April 15 || Predators || 5–3 || || Emery (1–0) || Rinne (1–1) || 17,174 || 1–1 || Honda Center || W1
|- align="center" bgcolor="#ffbbbb"
| 3 || April 17 || @ Predators || 4–3 || || Rinne (2–1) || Emery (1–1) || 17,113 || 1–2 || Bridgestone Arena || L2
|- align="center" bgcolor="#bbffbb"
| 4 || April 20 || @ Predators || 6–3 ||  || Emery (2–1) || Rinne (2–2) || 17,113 || 2–2 || Bridgestone Arena || W2
|- align="center" bgcolor="#ffbbbb" 
| 5 || April 22 || Predators || 4–3 || OT || Rinne (3–2) || Emery (2–2)  || 17,385 || 2–3 || Honda Center || L3
|- align="center" bgcolor="#ffbbbb" 
| 6 || April 24 || @ Predators || 4–2 || || Rinne (4–2) || Emery (2–3) || 17,113 || 2–4 || Bridgestone Arena || L4
|-

Standings

Divisional standings

Conference standings

Player statistics

Skaters
Note: GP = Games played; G = Goals; A = Assists; Pts = Points; +/− = Plus/minus; PIM = Penalty minutes

Goaltenders
Note: GP = Games played; GS = Games Started; TOI = Time on ice (minutes); W = Wins; L = Losses; OT = Overtime losses; GA = Goals against; GAA= Goals against average; SA= Shots against; SV= Saves; Sv% = Save percentage; SO= Shutouts

†Denotes player spent time with another team before joining Ducks. Stats reflect time with Ducks only.
‡Traded mid-season. 
Bold/italics denotes franchise record

Awards and records

Awards

Records

Milestones

Transactions
The Ducks have been involved in the following transactions during the 2010–11 season.

Trades

|}

Notes

Free agents acquired

Free agents lost

Claimed via waivers

Lost via waivers

Lost via retirement

Players signings

Draft picks 
The 2010 NHL Entry Draft in Los Angeles, took place from June 25–26, 2010. The Ducks had the 12th pick in the first round by virtue of finishing 11th in 2009–10 and not making any gains in the lottery that took place on Tuesday April 13, 2010. With their two picks in the first round, the Ducks took Cam Fowler, a defenseman from the Windsor Spitfires of the OHL and Long Beach-native Emerson Etem, a right winger from the Medicine Hat Tigers of the WHL. Both were ranked quite high by many analysts (Fowler as high as No. 3 and Etem as high as #8), however, things seemed to be working in the Ducks' favor picking them up at No. 12 and No. 29 respectively. Many analysts believe that because the Ducks' picks were ranked so high and they got them relatively low in the draft that the Ducks were one of the big winners at the 2010 draft.

The Ducks picks at the 2010 NHL Entry Draft in Los Angeles:

 Acquired Pick from Philadelphia
 Acquired Pick from Toronto
 Acquired Pick from Dallas
 Acquired Pick from Montreal via Pittsburgh

Minor league affiliates

Syracuse Crunch 
The Syracuse Crunch, based in Syracuse, NY will be the Ducks AHL affiliate for the 2010–11 season. The multiyear partnership was announced March 25, 2010.

Elmira Jackals 
The Bakersfield Condors, based in Bakersfield, CA were the Ducks ECHL affiliate for the 2009–10 season. The Condors were the Ducks affiliate in the ECHL since 2008, however, following the Ducks deal with the AHL's Syracuse Crunch, Anaheim found a new affiliate on the east coast: the Elmira Jackals.

See also 
 Anaheim Ducks
 Honda Center
 2010–11 NHL season

Other Anaheim–based teams in 2010–11
Los Angeles Angels of Anaheim (Angel Stadium of Anaheim)
 2010 Los Angeles Angels of Anaheim season
 2011 Los Angeles Angels of Anaheim season

References

External links 
2010–11 Anaheim Ducks season at ESPN
2010–11 Anaheim Ducks season at Hockey Reference

Anaheim Ducks seasons
Anaheim Ducks season, 2010-11
Anaheim
Mighty Ducks of Anaheim
Mighty Ducks of Anaheim